Chico Unified School District is a public school district based in Butte County, California.

External links
 

School districts in Butte County, California